Srinivasa Malla (Nepali: श्रीनिवास मल्ल) was a Malla dynasty king and the King of Patan. He was the son of Siddhi Narasimha Malla and reigned on Patan from 1661 until his abdication in 1685.

Early life 
Srinivasa Malla was involved in administrative works from an early age by his father Siddhi Narasimha Malla. By 1641. Srinivasa was sharing the responsibilities with his father and in 1649 he was even recognized as a joint ruler alongside his father.

Reign 
Srinivasa's father Siddhinarasimha went to a religious exile in 1657 and Srinivasa was recognized as the King. He was formally crowned as the King of Patan in 1661. During his reign, Patan had a boundary with Gorkha and Tanahun in the west and Gajuripeda in the north-west.

Battles with neighboring kingdoms 
In around 1658, he had a dispute with Pratap Malla of Kantipur and jointly with Jagat Prakash Malla of Bhadgaon, he attacked Kantipur. This benefitted Bhadgaon as its blocked trade routes were re-opened. In the same year, Kantipur and Patan signed an agreement and established friendly relations.

In 1660, Jagat Prakash Malla of Bhadgaon set fire to a small military outpost near Changu which came under the jurisdiction of Kantipur. Jagat Prakash also beheaded eight people and took some people as prisoners. In response to this, Patan and Kantipur jointly launched attacks against Bhadgaon and defeated it. In 1662, Srinivasasa Malla mediated the quarrel between Kantipur and Bhadaon and peace was restored.

Succession 
Srinivasa Malla began to train his son Yoga Narendra Malla from his early age in the kingdom's administrative works. Srinivasa Malla's mother died in 1679, which was followed by the death of one of his wife two years later. In addition to this, a general resentment against his son among the general public was building up due to the involvement of Yoga Narendra in explicit activities. All this caused great distress to him and led to Srinvasa abdicating the throne for his son in 1685.

Personal life 
Srinivasa Malla, like his father, was a king with great religious devotion. He was a Hindu but was liberal to Buddhism as well. He built several temples, renovated many, and gave generous land grants to religious places. He was also interested in literature and wrote dramas. He was actively involved in politics until his death in 1687.

References 

17th-century Nepalese people
Nepalese monarchs
1627 births
1687 deaths